This was the first edition of the tournament.

Irina-Camelia Begu won the title, defeating Lesia Tsurenko in the final, 6–4, 3–6, 6–2.

Seeds

Draw

Finals

Top half

Bottom half

References

Main Draw

Zed Tennis Open - Singles